Berta Elena Vidal de Battini (10 July 1900 — 19 May 1984) was an Argentine linguist, educationalist, writer and folklorist, whose life achievement is 10-volume selection of the Argentinian Folk Tales and Legends.

Biography 

Berta de Battini was born in 1900 in San Luis, Argentina.

She attended primary and secondary school in her home town. Then, she obtained PhD in University of Buenos Aires. Later, she worked as educationalist in the field of Spanish Philology and Argentine Folklore at her alma mater.

Her scientific research started under the rule of Amado Alonso, during her scientific career she realized many trips throughout Argentina, as well Europe. 

de Battini's main projects were Determinación de las regiones folklóricas del país y su contenido cultural (The Determination of country lore regions and its cultural meaning) and El español en la Argentina. El léxico (The Argentine Spanish. Lexis.).  

Berta Elena Vidal de Battini died in 1984.

Selected works

Fiction and folklore
 "Alas", 1924;
 "Mitos Sanluiseños", 1925;
 "Agua serrana", 1934;
 "Tierra puntana", 1937;
 "Campo y soledad", 1937;
 "Cuentos y leyendas populares de la Argentina", 1960;
 "La ciudad de San Luis", 1960.

Scientific investigations
 "El habla rural de San Luis", 1949;
 "Voces marinas en el habla rural de San Luis", 1949;
 "La narrativa popular de la Argentina. Leyendas de plantas", 1972

References

Sources 
 Elena Vidal de Battini on www.folkloredelnorte.com.ar (in Spanish)
 Berta Elena Vidal de Battini on biblioteca.unsl.edu.ar (in Spanish)

1900 births
1984 deaths
Argentine women scientists
Argentine writers
People from San Luis, Argentina
University of Buenos Aires alumni
Women linguists
Women folklorists